Hozon (保存) is a trademarked seasoning developed by David Chang and marketed by Momofuku. It is made from fermented nuts, grains, or seeds. Hozon comes from the Japanese word meaning "preserve"

Production
Hozon is made by fermenting koji fungus and salt on a substrate such as cashews, chickpeas, or lentils. Koji acts as the catalyst for fermentation and is added to the other ingredients in a controlled environment to age. During this time, complex microbial and enzymatic processes occur causing flavors to develop. Following fermentation, the liquids are separated and used to make bonji. This process is derived from the Japanese technique for making miso and tamari, though it replaces soy with nontraditional ingredients.

Usage
When fermentation is complete, the resulting mixture can be used as is, or pureed to a smoother consistency. Hozon can be used as a butter substitute, curry, or soup base. Hozon originated and has been produced in the Momofuku Culinary Lab, and since 2012 It has been used by chef Corey Lee at Benu in San Francisco and by Jamie Bissonnette of Toro.

References

Japanese cuisine
Japanese brand foods